Kogiinae is a subfamily of sperm whales of the family Kogiidae (the other subfamily being Scaphokogiinae) comprising the genera Kogia and the extinct Praekogia.

References

Sperm whales